The Bornean shortwing (Brachypteryx erythrogyna) is a species of bird in the Old World flycatcher family Muscicapidae. It is endemic to Borneo where it favours montane forest.

This species was formerly considered as a subspecies of the white-browed shortwing, now the Javan shortwing (Brachypteryx montana). The white-browed shortwing was split into five separate species based on the deep genetic difference between the populations coupled with the significant differences in plumage and vocalization.

References

Bornean shortwing
Birds described in 1888